Dasycnemia naparimalis is a species of snout moth in the genus Dasycnemia. It was described by William James Kaye in 1925 and is known from Trinidad.

References

Moths described in 1925
Chrysauginae